The 1955 LeHi 300 (known officially in NASCAR as 1955-40) was a NASCAR Grand National Series event that was held on October 9, 1955, at Memphis-Arkansas Speedway in LeHi, Arkansas.

The race car drivers still had to commute to the races using the same stock cars that competed in a typical weekend's race through a policy of homologation (and under their own power). This policy was in effect until roughly 1975. By 1980, NASCAR had completely stopped tracking the year model of all the vehicles and most teams did not take stock cars to the track under their own power any more.

Race report
The 200-lap race took three hours and thirty-four minutes to complete in front of 8500 live spectators. Speedy Thompson defeated Marvin Panch by ¾ of a single lap. Ford would win their first race as a manufacturer since 1950. Jim Reed was disqualified for using non-stock cylinder heads, and was considered a repeat violation according to NASCAR. The in-race disqualification resulted in Reed given the last-place finish on lap 8. All of the 41 drivers on the racing grid were Caucasian American-born males. This was the 40th racing event out of the 45 done in the 1955 NASCAR Grand National Series season.

Bob Flock would make his only NASCAR Grand National Series start under car owner Carl Kiekhafer. Due to strained relationships between Flock and Kiekhafer, Flock would never drive for him again. In this race, 21 of the drivers had previously won in the NASCAR Grand National Cup Series. This was also the 12th Of Buck Baker's 16 consecutive finishes to bring the 1955 NASCAR Grand National Series to a conclusion. It was also the 10th of 12 starts for Johnny Mantz.

The total amount of prize winnings that could have been earned from this racing event was $9,120 ($ when adjusted for inflation). Smokey Yunick and Carl Kiekhaefer were the two notable crew chiefs that participated in the event.

Tiny Lund would make his career start during this event and would make $60 for his troubles ($ when adjusted for inflation). Other drivers making their NASCAR Cup Series debut in this race included Johnny Allen, Bill Morton, Jim Murray, Norm Nelson, and Chuck Stevenson. A lot of drivers would make their grand exits from NASCAR after this race: this relatively long list included Floyd Curtis, Hooker Hood, Roscoe Rann and Leland Sewell. One-time race car drivers Bob Coleman, Al Hager, and Gene Rose would make their only NASCAR appearances during this race.

Even during the 1950s, it was unusual to see four cars fail to finish the race due to problems with the vapor lock. It occurs when the liquid fuel changes state from liquid to gas while still in the fuel delivery system. This disrupts the operation of the fuel pump, causing loss of feed pressure to the carburetor, resulting in transient loss of power or complete stalling. Restarting the engine from this state may be difficult.  The fuel can vaporize due to being heated by the engine, by the local climate or due to a lower boiling point at high altitude.

Qualifying

Top 10 finishers

Timeline
Section reference: 
 Start of race: Tim Flock started the race with the pole position.
 Lap 3: A piston located inside Ted Cannady's vehicle stopped working properly.
 Lap 5: Radiator issues forced Fonty Flock into the sidelines for the remainder of the race.
 Lap 8: Jim Reed was disqualified from the race.
 Lap 10: The radiator on Floyd Curtis' vehicle no longer worked properly.
 Lap 13: The gasket on Eddie Skinner's vehicle fell off.
 Lap 19: The vapor lock on Curtis Turner's vehicle acted in an unusual manner.
 Lap 22: Russ Graham's vehicle overheated; Bill Widenhouse's radiator started acting strangely.
 Lap 27: Dave Terrell had a terminal crash.
 Lap 29: Joe Weatherly's vehicle developed vapor lock issues.
 Lap 38: Gwyn Staley's fuel pump started acting funny, forcing him off the track.
 Lap 43: Speedy Thompson takes over the lead from Tim Flock.
 Lap 46: Johnny Mantz suddenly had problems with his vapor lock along with Joe Eubanks.
 Lap 55: Billy Carden had a terminal crash.
 Lap 63: Jim Murray's fuel pump was giving him problems.
 Lap 65: Tiny Lund had a terminal crash.
 Lap 123: Bill Morton had a terminal crash.
 Lap 132: The rear end of Herb Thomas' vehicle fell off, forcing him to leave the event.
 Lap 162: Norm Nelson's engine became problematic, causing him to exit the race early.
 Finish: Speedy Thompson was declared the winner of the race.

References

LeHi 300
LeHi 300
NASCAR races at Memphis-Arkansas Speedway